A Biblical word, dvir  may refer to:


Names
 Debir King of Eglon, a Canaanite king of Eglon, slain by Joshua. Aided by miracles, Joshua's army routed the Canaanite military, forcing Debir and the other kings to seek refuge in a cave. There they were trapped until later executed.

Places
 A royal Canaanite city, also known as Kiriath-Sepher and Kiriath-Sannah. It became a Kohanic city. Its location is unclear, but today it is commonly identified with Khirbet Rabud southwest of Hebron.
 A site mentioned to be in the low plain of Achor. Though its exact location is not known, the name may have survived in Thogheret ed-Debr, southwest of Jericho.
 A location in Gilead, at the border of the Tribe of Gad, commonly believed to be the same as Lo-Debar.

Religion
 The dvir, the innermost part of the Holy of Holies in Solomon's Temple.

In apocryphal literature

According to the ancient apocryphal Lives of the Prophets, after the death of Zechariah Ben Jehoiada, the priests of the Temple could no more, as before, see the apparitions of the angels of the Lord, nor could make divinations with the Ephod, nor give responses from the Debir.

See also
Tell Beit Mirsim
Dvir (disambiguation)

References

Bibliography

 

Monarchs of the Hebrew Bible
Hebrew Bible cities
Gilead